Arena of Death is a fantasy combat board game published by Simulations Publications, Inc. (SPI) in 1980.

Gameplay
Arena of Death is a game of arena combat using the combat system developed for the first edition of DragonQuest. Acting as gladiators, players take on the combat roles of various fantasy creatures and warriors.

Publication history
SPI published the fantasy role-playing game DragonQuest in 1980. The combat system was published as a pull-out game, Arena of Death, in Issue #4 of Moves (September 1980). The game was subsequently released as a boxed game.

Reception
In Issue 38 of The Space Gamer, Eric Paperman was not overly impressed, saying, "The only people to whom I can recommend this game are fantasy role-players interested in adapting Arena of Death'''s combat and maneuver rules for use with their FRPG. DragonQuest'' is probably a better buy; for [a slightly higher price] you get monsters, magic, and other skills, and a slightly more complete combat and character generation system."

References

Board games introduced in 1980
DragonQuest
Simulations Publications games